Battle of Dabhoi was a major confrontation between the Trimbak Rao Dabhade's Maratha faction and Baji Rao I Maratha faction due to interference of Baji Rao I in Gujarat Province. It was a political battle which was fought due to rights of Chauth (Tax Collection) of Gujarat. The rights of collecting Chauth of Gujarat was held by Dabhade's from the time of Khanderao Dabhade. Baji Rao I ask Trimbak Rao Dabhade to share the rights of Chauth of Gujarat to him. But Trimbak Rao refuse to share the rights of Chauth and due to this the battle was fought. The Pawar brothers of Dhar were also upset with Baji Rao I due his policy in Malwa so they also join Trimbak Rao's side. Some other sources says that Trimbak Rao join Nizam of Hyderabad due to which Bajirao I attack him.

Background
In the year 1731, Baji Rao I ask Trimbak Rao Dabhade to share the rights of Chauth of Gujarat to him. But Trimbak Rao refuse to share the rights of Chauth and due to this the battle was fought. The Pawar brothers of Dhar were also upset with Baji Rao I due his policy so they also join Trimbak Rao's side.

Battle
This move was considered unacceptable by Baji Rao I and his brother Chimaji Appa, who led a large army to intercept Trimbak Rao Dabhade during the Battle of Dabhoi. Where in battle Trimbak Rao who was seated on an elephant was shot by a musketeer and due to which the morale of his troops started decreasing. After the death of Trimbak Rao in battlefield Baji Rao retreat his force and fled towards Satara.

Aftermath
The matter was settled by Shahu between Peshwa and Dhabade. Sambhaji Dabhade were given the title of Sersenapati. Pilaji Gaekwad was appointed as chief of Gujarat Province. The Chauth in Malwa were given to Pawar brothers.

See also
Shahu
Khanderao Dabhade

References

Dabhoi
Dabhoi